Spring was a social-liberal and pro-European political party in Poland led by a former mayor of Słupsk, Robert Biedroń.

History 
The party was founded on 3 February 2019 in Hala Torwar and ran in the 2019 European elections, winning three seats.

For the 2019 parliamentary election, the party formed a coalition with the Democratic Left Alliance and Razem, known as The Left, winning 19 seats in the Sejm.

The party was set to merge with the Democratic Left Alliance (SLD) into a unitary party called the New Left in 2021. On 11 June 2021, party's general assembly voted in favour of dissolving the party in order to merge with the SLD. The merger was finished on 9 October 2021 via a unification congress.

Ideology

Platform 
The core ideology of the party revolves around issues such as women’s rights, equality, creating a better community, bringing the European Union closer to the citizens, civic participation, increasing green politics and animal rights, rights of disabled people, innovative education, better public transport, better healthcare and establishment of the Justice and Reconciliation Commission. 

The party proposes to introduce a minimum monthly pension at PLN 1,600 per month as well as raising the minimum wage to PLN 2,700 by 2020 and then PLN 3265 by 2022 per month. Another proposal is to introduce a new law that would set the minimum wage at 60% of the national monthly income average. Spring supports increasing wages of the teachers, and proposes to set the wage at PLN 3,500 per month for teachers that are just beginning their job. Abolition of ZUS (Social Insurance Institution) and KRUS (Agricultural Social Insurance Fund) and transferring their competences to the tax administration. Yet another proposal is free access to the internet in the entire country. The party also pledges to increase disability benefit and to introduce a paid weekly holiday for carers of the disabled.

On the environment, the party leader Biedroń stressed the importance of fighting smog by closing all mines by 2035, departing from coal and switching to renewable sources of energy. Biedroń also stressed the importance of protecting animal rights and called for the creation of an office of the Advocate of Natural Rights. On education, Spring takes a stance of making the education system more practical and less theory-based. The party also proposes to introduce obligatory anti-violence education and sex education in all types of schools, as well as doubling the number of hours during which English is taught in schools. Furthermore, the party wants to remove religious education classes from schools. Spring is committed to deglomeration of civil servant offices from Warsaw to other smaller cities. On world view issues, Spring takes a liberal stance by proposing to introduce civil partnerships for opposite-sex and same-sex couples as well as the legalisation of same-sex marriage, legalisation of abortion up to 12 weeks of pregnancy, IVF funded by the state, total separation of church and state and abolition of the so-called Church Fund. In a TV interview for TVN24, Biedroń stated that the cost of his party's programme will be 35 billion PLN.

Election Results

Sejm

European Parliament

Presidential

References

External links 

 

 
Centre-left parties in Europe
Liberal parties in Poland
LGBT political advocacy groups in Poland
Political parties disestablished in 2021
Political parties established in 2019
Social liberal parties
Progressive parties